Man of Korea (literally Solidarity for Men) is a non-profit masculist organization in South Korea. It was founded in 2008, and first leader was Sung Jae-gi.

Summary 
Man of Korea has insisted on the abolition of the Ministry of Gender Equality and Family by reason of pro-woman on their own terms, and the revival of the Extra Point System for Veterans who served in the military in South Korea. The group has been under financial distress with more than 200 million won debts because it did not get government support.

Sources 
 Kim Yong-suk: The Ddanji December, 2012. The ddanji group, 2012,

External links 
 Man of Korea website 
 Man of Korea's Naver page, Naver

References

2008 establishments in South Korea
Masculism
Non-profit organizations based in South Korea
Organizations established in 2008